Rachel Toni Algaze Croson is an economist currently serving as Executive Vice President and Provost of the University of Minnesota, and McKnight Endowed Professor of Economics. Until March 2020, she served as Dean of the College of Social Science and MSU Foundation Professor of Economics at Michigan State University. She earned her bachelor's degree in economics and the philosophy of science from the University of Pennsylvania and her master's and Ph.D. in economics from Harvard University. 

Her previous positions include Dean of the School of Business at the University of Texas at Arlington; Division Director of Social and Economic Sciences at the National Science Foundation; Director of the Negotiations Center, Professor of Economics, and Professor of Organizations, Strategy, and International Management at the University of Texas at Dallas. After receiving her Ph.D. she was Assistant and then Associate Professor (with tenure) in the Department of Operations and Information Management at the Wharton School and a member of the Psychology Graduate Group of the University of Pennsylvania.

Research 
Provost Croson’s research focuses on experimental and behavioral economics; studying how people make economic decisions, what mistakes they make, and how to improve their performance.

This research draws from and contributes to multiple disciplines. Substantively her research has focused on the voluntary provision of public goods (especially public radio), bargaining and negotiation, behavioral operations management, and gender and cultural differences. She has served on the Editorial Boards of the American Economic Review, Organizational Behavior and Human Decision Processes, Management Science, Experimental Economics, and Journal of Economic Behavior and Organization. She was pivotal in creating and leading workshops to help female junior faculty in Economics advance through the profession, and won the Carolyn Shaw Bell Award from the American Economic Association (2017). She is currently a AAAS Fellow (class of 2021) and is appointed as a McKnight Endowed Professor in the Department of Economics at the University of Minnesota. 

Based on her research, she offers the following advice on negotiation:

Selected works 
 See Google Scholar page and Orcid profile

References 

American women economists
20th-century American economists
21st-century American economists
University of Minnesota faculty
Harvard University alumni
University of Pennsylvania alumni
Living people
Behavioral economists
Experimental economists
Year of birth missing (living people)
20th-century American women
21st-century American women